Down for Life is the only album released by Southern rap group D4L. The album was released on November 8, 2005 on Atlantic Records, Asylum Records, Ice Age Entertainment and Dee Money Entertainment. The album debuted at number 22 in the US, selling 40,000 copies in the first week.

Track listing

Charts

Weekly charts

Year-end charts

References

2005 debut albums
D4L albums